Vauchamps is a former commune in the Doubs department in the Bourgogne-Franche-Comté region in eastern France. On 1 January 2018, it was merged into the commune of Bouclans.

Geography 
The commune occupies a wooded plain with several small lakes and the Gour, over which there is a bridge in the middle of the village.

Population

See also
 Communes of the Doubs department

References

External links

 Vauchamps on the regional Web Site 

Former communes of Doubs